Carlos "Carlitos" Miguel Páez Rodríguez (born October 31, 1953), known as "the man of the iron spirit", spent 72 days in the Andes following a plane crash, during which the sixteen survivors of the 45 on board resorted to cannibalism to stay alive.  He was 18 years old at the time of the crash, and turned 19 on the mountains.

Biography
He is the son of Uruguayan artist Carlos Páez Vilaró. Uruguayan Air Force Flight 571 crashed on October 13, 1972. He was portrayed by Bruce Ramsay and John Malkovich (as the older Carlos, the narrator at the start of the movie, uncredited) in the 1993 feature film Alive. He was a rugby player for the Old Christians Club.

He became an agricultural technician graduated from Universidad del Trabajo del Uruguay, developing this activity for 10 years. In 1992 he started his career in advertising as a member of Nivel-Publicis creative team. He founded his own agency, Rating Publicidad and was director of Bates Uruguay Publicidad. Present day, apart from his activities as a lecturer, he manages his company of Communication Consultancy and Public Relations. He has two children, Maria Elena de los Andes "Gochi" and Carlos Diego; and three granddaughters, Mía, Justina and Violeta. In 2003, Páez published the book After the tenth day which became a great success and has gone through 14 printings.

See also
 Roberto Canessa
 Nando Parrado

References

External links

 Carlitos Páez on Twitter.
 Despues del dia 10 (After the tenth Day): La Cordillera De Los Andes Me Enseño a Vivir (Spanish Edition).

1953 births
Living people
Rugby union players from Montevideo
Survivors of aviation accidents or incidents
Uruguayan Air Force Flight 571
Uruguayan businesspeople
Uruguayan Roman Catholics
Uruguayan rugby union players
Uruguayan cattlemen
Uruguayan autobiographers
People educated at Stella Maris College (Montevideo)